Wenderoth is a surname that may refer to:

 Frederick August Wenderoth (1819–1884), 19th-century German-American painter
 Georg Wilhelm Franz Wenderoth (1774–1861), 18th- and 19th-century German botanist
 Georg Wenderoth, German rugby player
 Joe Wenderoth (born 1966), American poet
 Oscar Wenderoth (1871–1938), American architect
 Peter Wenderoth, Australian researcher in visual perception